Vice Admiral Malcolm Graham Rutherford  (21 March 1941 – 6 June 1997) was a Royal Navy officer who became Deputy Chief of the Defence Staff (Equipment Capability).

Naval career
Educated at New College School, Gordonstoun and the Royal Naval College, Dartmouth, Rutherford joined the Royal Navy in 1959. Promoted to captain in 1984, he was appointed Weapon Systems Director for the Upholder class of submarines and then Commander of the Weapon Engineering Training Establishment . Promoted to commodore in 1990, he became Director of Personnel at the Ministry of Defence and was awarded the CBE for his service during the Gulf War.

Following promotion to rear admiral, he was made Naval Secretary in 1992 and Deputy Chief of the Defence Staff (Equipment Capability) in 1994 as vice admiral. He retired in 1995 and died in 1997.

Family
He was married to Fleur, and they had two children.

References

|-

1941 births
1997 deaths
People educated at Gordonstoun
Royal Navy admirals
Commanders of the Order of the British Empire